Broos  (Frail) is a 1997 Dutch film directed by Mijke de Jong. It is based on a play, in which five sisters meet up to record a message for their parents' 40th wedding anniversary.
The film was shot on location in 14 days with backing from the Netherlands Film Fund.

All five actresses won the Golden Calf for Best Actress Cinemagazine saw Broos as a "fine prologue" to de Jong's 2014 film Brozer (Frailer).

Cast
Marnie Blok	... 	Ted
Lieneke le Roux	... 	Lian
Maartje Nevejan	... 	Leen
Leonoor Pauw	... 	Muis
Adelheid Roosen	... 	Carlos

References

External links 
 

Dutch drama films
1997 films
1990s Dutch-language films
Films directed by Mijke de Jong